The 2013 Campeonato Sul-Mato-Grossense de Futebol was the 35th edition of the Mato Grosso do Sul's top professional football league. The competition began on January 19, and ended on May 5. CENE won the championship by the 5th time, while SERC and Corumbaense were relegated.

Format
On the first stage, all teams are split in two groups. Each team plays twice against all teams in their own group. The worst team from each group is relegated, and the top four teams from the group qualify to the quarterfinals. The playoffs are two-leg matches.

Qualifications
The champion and the runner-up qualify to the 2014 Copa do Brasil.

Participating teams

First stage

Standings

Group A

Group B

Results

Group A

Group B

Final stage

CENE won the 2013 Campeonato Sul-Mato-Grossense.

References

Sul-Mato-Grossense
2013